Afroturbonilla multitudinalis is a species of sea snail, a marine gastropod mollusc in the family Pyramidellidae, the pyrams and their allies. This species is one of three other species within the Afroturbonilla genus, with the exception of the others being Afroturbonilla engli and Afroturbonilla hattenbergeriana.

Distribution
This species occurs within the Atlantic Ocean off the west coast of Ghana.

References

External links
 To Encyclopedia of Life
 To World Register of Marine Species

Endemic fauna of Ghana
Pyramidellidae
Gastropods described in 2002